Marcel Lettre (born August 9, 1972) is a former United States federal government official. He served as the Under Secretary of Defense for Intelligence from December 2015 to January 2017. He now works for Lockheed Martin.

Early life
Born in Gainesville, Georgia, Marcel Lettre attended Terry Sanford Senior High School in Fayetteville, North Carolina, graduating in 1990. He graduated from Sewanee: The University of the South with a B.A. degree in political science in 1994. Lettre earned a M.P.P. degree from the John F. Kennedy School of Government at Harvard University in 2000.

Career
Lettre was nominated as Under Secretary of Defense for Intelligence by President Barack Obama on August 5, 2015. He was confirmed by the United States Senate in December 2015, and he stepped down in January 2017.

Lettre now works for Lockheed Martin.

Personal life
Lettre is married, and he has two daughters.

External links

References

1972 births
Living people
People from Gainesville, Georgia
Sewanee: The University of the South alumni
Harvard Kennedy School alumni
Obama administration personnel
United States Under Secretaries of Defense
Lockheed Martin people